Juliagrace is a New Zealand professional speaker and award-winning singer and songwriter. At the age three, she played the piano and performed to large crowds at twelve. From 2000 to 2005, she was the lead vocalist for the Auckland-based live electronica outfit Elevator. In 2005, she began her solo career in songwriting which won her the success of the album of juliagrace and Beautiful Survivor in 2010. Grace is also known for her mental health-advocate work, since 2012.

Career 
In 2000, Juliagrace became involved in the New Zealand-based band Elevator, playing as a guitar and piano soloist until 2005. In October of that year, Grace left the band for a solo music career and new life. She has pursued this since.

2005–10: juliagrace and Beautiful Survivor 
Juliagrace's solo career began in 2005, with the release of her self-titled album on the Parachute Music label in October of that year. The album garnered immense radio success, scoring four number one singles in New Zealand as well as two top 20 hits on The Rock Across Australia music charts.  . She toured the U.S. and Australia as support act for the Parachute Band in early 2006, and was a mainstage performer at AGMF '06. Julia regularly featured at Parachute Music Festival.

Julia's self-titled album, "juliagrace", received the Tui Award for Best Gospel/Christian Album at the New Zealand Music Awards 2006.  The award was presented by Prime Minister Helen Clark on behalf of the Recording Industry Association of New Zealand (RIANZ) on October 18, 2006, at the Aotea Centre in Auckland, New Zealand.

This Album was followed up by the NZ Music Award finalist ‘Beautiful Survivor’ as well as an EP of Hymns entitled ‘It Is Well’. Julia was asked to present the award for Gospel Album of the Year at the 2016 awards ceremony.

2011–present 
Building on her 25-year career as a singer and songwriter with extensive national and international touring experience, and years of work in the classroom, Julia has been a Keynote Speaker and Contributor at over 120 Conferences and Events in the last two and a half years on the topics of Mental Wellness including crisis, depression, anxiety and stress. Grace has a knack of tackling the ‘big’ topics and breaking them down into memorable ideas, giving everyone a set of practical tools to help support their brain and body. In her opinion, Mental Wellness issues are "REASONABLE, they make sense UNIVERSAL, we are all on the spectrum of Wellness MANAGEABLE and there are many tools in the toolbox."

In 2013, Grace released her first E.P album, It Is Well E.P, which reflected her divorce with her husband the previous year in 2012. The album was one of the most popular and top-charted E.Ps in New Zealand, earning an award at the 2016 New Zealand Gospel Album Awards Ceremony.

In 2016, Grace released Girl on the Kitchen Floor.

Personal life 
Grace's divorce took a toll on her self esteem. In an interview with Channel Magazine, she discussed this. "I didn’t recognise the stressed out, sick person in the mirror," says Julia, looking back to when the man she had loved for her entire adult life walked away from her. "So, I stopped looking at her."

In 2016, following a personal journey of dealing with crisis, clinical depression and anxiety Julia released her latest album Girl On The Kitchen Floor which was also a finalist for a New Zealand Music Award in 2017.

In January 2019, she created a one-minute Facebook video series on Mental Wellness topics that have collectively had over 50,000 views and a reach of 95,000+ people.

Discography 
juliagrace (2005)
Beautiful Survivor (2010)
It Is Well E.P (2013)
Girl On The Kitchen Floor (2016)

References

External links 
Official Website
Parachute Records website
Myspace Page
"Juliagrace" album review
Album review at crossrhythms.co.uk
Article at crossrhythms.co.uk

Year of birth missing (living people)
Living people
New Zealand Christians
New Zealand performers of Christian music
Christian music songwriters
New Zealand motivational speakers
New Zealand women singer-songwriters
21st-century New Zealand women singers